Mihály Oláh (born 25 January 1949) is a Hungarian equestrian. He competed in two events at the 1980 Summer Olympics.

References

External links
 

1949 births
Living people
Hungarian male equestrians
Olympic equestrians of Hungary
Equestrians at the 1980 Summer Olympics
People from Tét
Sportspeople from Győr-Moson-Sopron County